Leningradsky (masculine), Leningradskaya (feminine), or Leningradskoye (neuter) is the name of several inhabited localities in Russia.

Urban localities
Leningradsky, Chukotka Autonomous Okrug, an urban-type settlement in Iultinsky District of Chukotka Autonomous Okrug

Rural localities
Leningradsky, Kemerovo Oblast, a settlement in Beregovaya Rural Territory of Kemerovsky District of Kemerovo Oblast
Leningradsky, Novosibirsk Oblast, a settlement in Krasnozyorsky District of Novosibirsk Oblast
Leningradsky, Samara Oblast, a settlement in Alexeyevsky District of Samara Oblast
Leningradsky, Voronezh Oblast, a settlement in Anokhinskoye Rural Settlement of Talovsky District of Voronezh Oblast
Leningradskaya (rural locality), a stanitsa in Leningradsky Rural Okrug of Leningradsky District of Krasnodar Krai